Beta-peptidyl aminopeptidase (BapA) is an enzyme. This enzyme catalyses the following chemical reaction

 Cleaves N-terminal beta-homoamino acids from peptides composed of 2 to 6 amino acids

Sphingosinicella xenopeptidilytica strain 3-2W4 could use beta-peptides beta-homoVal-beta-homoAla-beta-homoLeu and beta-homoAla-beta-homoLeu as only source of carbon and energy.

References

External links 
 

EC 3.4.11